Janet Skuse (née Field; 20 December 1943 – 12 July 2007), known as Rusty Skuse, was renowned as the most tattooed woman in Britain.

Biography
Skuse, a driver in the Women's Royal Army Corps based at Aldershot in Hampshire, had her first tattoo aged 17 in 1961, which resulted in her being put on a charge. By 1964 she had 62 tattoos and was becoming widely known. Soon she was spending more than half her Army pay on getting more tattoos from her future husband, Bill Skuse, at his studio in the amusement arcade in Aldershot's High Street. She turned down an offer from a showman in Glasgow, Scotland to become a tattooed attraction; however, the offer convinced her to get tattooed completely. Using £100 given to her by her mother as a 21st birthday present, Skuse spent the money on more tattoos, much to her mother's consternation.

Recognition
For over twenty years she appeared in the Guinness World Records as Britain's most tattooed woman. At one time there was a life-sized waxwork of her displayed outside 'The Guinness World of Records' exhibition at the Trocadero in Piccadilly, London. She trained under her husband to become a tattoo artist in her own right. On their retirement Bill and Rusty Skuse opened a boarding kennel and stray dogs home in Norfolk. Rusty Skuse returned to tattooing for a period, running a private tattooing studio in Dereham, Norfolk. In 1979 she was the subject of a documentary titled Second Skin.

Skuse died in 2007, following a long battle with kidney disease.

References

External links
Biography of Skuse on the Tattoo Club of Great Britain
Unique Tattoo Ideas & Designs For Men & Women
ShiningLight Piercing Body Jewelry & Tattoo
Photograph of 'Rusty' and Les Skuse

1943 births
2007 deaths
British tattoo artists
People known for being heavily tattooed
Artists from Aldershot
Deaths from kidney disease
Women's Royal Army Corps soldiers